Potamotrygon tigrina, also known as the tiger river stingray, is a species of freshwater ray in the family Potamotrygonidae. This endangered species is endemic to black- and whitewater rivers in the upper Amazon basin in northeastern Peru. It is sometimes kept in aquariums and has been bred in captivity, but it is generally a sensitive species.

The tiger river stingray is closely related to P. schroederi of the Rio Negro–Orinoco. Prior to the scientific description of the tiger river stingray, some used the name P. menchacai, but this is incorrect. P. menchacai is a synonym for the largespot river stingray (P. falkneri).

References

External links 
 

tigrina
Freshwater fish of Peru
Endemic fauna of Peru
Fish of the Amazon basin
Fish described in 2011